Grail Quest is the quest for the Holy Grail.

Grail Quest can also refer to:
 Grailquest, a series of gamebooks by J. H. Brennan
 The Grail Quest, a series of books written by the historical novelist Bernard Cornwell